Impossible Goodbye is a 1962 Polish drama film directed by Stanisław Jędryka. It was entered into the 1962 Cannes Film Festival.

Cast
 Wiesław Gołas - Robert Staniewski
 Danuta Szaflarska - Zofia Szarlit
 Józef Kondrat - Director Szarlit
 Elżbieta Czyżewska - Teresa Kwaśnikówna
 Tadeusz Fijewski - Jankowski
 Jan Świderski - Kleberg
 Hanka Bielicka - Korolkiewiczowa
 Bolesław Płotnicki - Korolkiewicz
 Janusz Ziejewski - Żaczek
 Jadwiga Andrzejewska - Ania
 JarosŁaw Skulski - Ogórek
 Ignacy Machowski - Inspector

References

External links

1962 films
1960s Polish-language films
1962 drama films
Polish black-and-white films
Films directed by Stanisław Jędryka
Polish drama films